The Muppets Studio, LLC, formerly The Muppets Holding Company, LLC, is a wholly owned entertainment subsidiary of Disney Parks, Experiences and Products, formed in 2004 through The Walt Disney Company's acquisition of The Muppets and Bear in the Big Blue House intellectual properties from The Jim Henson Company.

Background
In the late-1980s, Jim Henson had been in talks with Disney CEO Michael Eisner to sell Jim Henson Productions to the Walt Disney Company. In August 1989, the two officially announced a deal for Disney to purchase Jim Henson Productions for $150 million. The deal fell through several months after Jim Henson's death in 1990.

Despite the collapse of the merger deal, by 1992, Disney and Jim Henson Productions had already struck a number of deals:
Exclusive domestic rights to Henson theme park attractions in the western U.S. until May 1994 plus 2 year non-exclusively, including the design of two Muppet attractions at Walt Disney World
Buena Vista Home Video's worldwide distribution rights to Henson's 300 hours of programming and a financing deal for up to 3 home video projects
Certain cable television distribution rights for Disney Channel until 1997
International distribution rights for existing TV programming in free broadcast, cable or pay-per-view markets
Theatrical distribution for The Muppet Christmas Carol (1992) and Muppet Treasure Island (1996)
Dinosaurs co-production
In 1996, the Jim Henson Company produced Muppets Tonight for ABC, which had just been acquired by Disney.

The Henson family subsequently sold the entirety of the Jim Henson Company to German conglomerate EM.TV in 2000. In 2003, the Henson family repurchased The Jim Henson Company from EM.TV.

History

Muppets Holding Company

Eisner, still interested in the Muppet properties, re-opened negotiations with the Hensons and announced the purchase of The Muppets and Bear in the Big Blue House assets from The Jim Henson Company for $75 million on February 17, 2004.  The acquired Muppet assets were then placed into The Muppets Holding Company with Chris Curtin as general manager within Disney Consumer Products. One of the first appearances that the Muppets made after the purchase was on the TV special The Nick and Jessica Variety Hour in April 2004, starring Nick Lachey and Jessica Simpson. A new website was launched in November 2004 and the Muppets made an appearance on the 2004 Christmas episode of Saturday Night Live.

The first Muppet production under full Disney control, The Muppets' Wizard of Oz, went into production immediately and aired on ABC in May 2005. On July 30, 2005, Animal and Pepe the King Prawn made appearance on The X Games 11 Preview show of All Access on ESPN2.  Bear's first appearance under Disney's control was in the reality show, Breakfast With Bear in 2005.

A fiftieth birthday tour for Kermit, "Kermit's World Tour" was planned with leadership changes made just days before the tour began.  The tour made its initial three stops before being canceled: Kermit, Texas;  Johnson Space Center tour; and cake with The Rockettes at Radio City Music Hall, NYC. Following Eisner's exit from Disney, new CEO Bob Iger removed the head of the Muppets Holding Company and several senior staff members hand-picked by Eisner. The Muppets Holding Company was then paired with Baby Einstein (before it was acquired by Kids II, Inc. in 2013) under Senior Vice President and General Manager R. Russell Hampton Jr.

ABC, in October 2005, commissioned America's Next Muppet, a script and five script outlines, but ABC was reluctant to green light America's Next Muppet, and it never got out of the planning stage. Muppet Holding's new general manager instead licensed the Muppets out to TF1, a French television network, to produce Muppet TV in September 2006.

The Muppets Studio
In 2006, the Muppets Holding Company was transferred from the Disney Consumer Products unit to The Walt Disney Studios; with studio executives passing on oversight, the unit was placed in the special events group. That same year, Disney contracted with Puppet Heap to rebuild, maintain, and create puppet characters for the Muppets Studio. In April 2007, the Muppets Holding Company changed its name to The Muppets Studio under new leadership by Special Events Group SVP Lylle Breier.

In 2008, The Muppets Studio began a licensing agreement with F.A.O. Schwarz to create a Muppet-themed boutique where customers can design their own Muppet. In 2013, Disney Theatrical Productions revealed that a show based on The Muppets was in active development and that a 15-minute show had been conducted by Thomas Schumacher to see how the technical components would work out.

The company was transferred in 2014 to Disney's new media unit, Disney Consumer Products and Interactive Media, specifically DCPI Labs. On April 3, 2015, a series of shorts named Muppet Moments premiered on Disney Junior. The series features conversations between the Muppets and young children. By April, Bill Prady was commissioned to write a script for a new Muppets pilot with the title The Muppets, which was greenlit by ABC, and ran for one season.

Disney Consumer Products and Interactive Media became part of Disney Parks, Experiences and Products in a March 2018 company reorganization. That same month, a reboot of the 1980s Muppet Babies series debuted on Disney Junior. A relaunch of the Muppets franchise was planned as of February 2018 for the then-unnamed Disney streaming service scheduled to be launched in 2019. Soon two series were under development for the Disney+ streaming service, the unscripted short-form series Muppets Now, and the scripted comedy Muppets Live Another Day. Live Another Day was from Adam Horowitz, Eddy Kitsis, and Josh Gad, and was planned as an eight-episode series which would depict events taking place after The Muppets Take Manhattan. The series was at ABC Signature Studios with a pilot order when Muppets Studios vice president Debbie McClellan departed and her replacement, Disney Parks Live Entertainment senior vice president David Lightbody, wanted a different take on the project. Unwilling to drop their concept, the creative trio left the project. Muppets Now continued development and premiered on the streaming service on July 31, 2020.

Leadership
General manager
Chris Curtin, 2004–2005
Russell Hampton, 2005–May 2006
Lylle Breier, Fall 2006-

Vice-president
Debbie McClellan, c.2015— 2019
David Lightbody, 2019–present (senior vice-president)
Leigh Slaughter, 2020–present

Projects

Disney Junior shows
Breakfast with Bear reality show (2005–2006) Disney Channel
Muppet Moments short series (2015) Disney Junior
Muppet Babies (2018–2022) Disney Junior

The Muppets
The Muppets' Wizard of Oz (2005)
Best of the Muppets CD (2005)
Statler and Waldorf: From the Balcony (2005–2006)
The Muppets: A Green and Red Christmas CD (2006)
Before You Leap (2006)
Muppet Mobile Lab (2006–present) Audio-animatronic figures at Disney theme parks
Muppets TV (2006) TF1; a French hour long show with the Muppets run a TV station similar to The Jim Henson Hour MuppeTelevision segment
Studio DC: Almost Live, 2 specials, August 3, 2008 & October 2008, Disney Channel special featuring the Muppets and Disney Channel stars: Miley Cyrus, Ashley Tisdale and Jonas Brothers
A Muppets Christmas: Letters to Santa (2008)
special skits on some ABC DVD releases (“Desperate Housepigs” on “Desperate Housewives” DVD)
 Muppet YouTube videos (2008–2018) 
 The Muppets Kitchen with Cat Cora (2010)
The Muppets (2011)
Lady Gaga and the Muppets Holiday Spectacular, 2013
Muppisodes (2013–2014) online
Muppets Most Wanted (2014)
Disney Drive-On with the Muppets (August 1, 2014) 6 episodes on Disney Movies Anywhere
The Muppets (2015–2016) ABC
Muppets Now (2020) Disney+
 Muppets Haunted Mansion (2021) Disney+
 The Muppets Mayhem (2023) Disney+

Live Shows
Muppets Ahoy! stage show (2006) on Disney Wonder
The Muppets Present...Great Moments in American History (2016–2020) Live show at Magic Kingdom

See also
 Avenue Q
 Higher Ground Productions
 Waffles + Mochi
 Sesame Workshop

Notes

References

External links

Official website at Disney.com

2004 establishments in California
Entertainment companies established in 2004
Entertainment companies of the United States
Disney production studios
The Walt Disney Company subsidiaries
The Muppets